Charles Murray may refer to:

Politicians 
Charles Murray, 1st Earl of Dunmore (1661–1710), British peer
Charles Murray (author and diplomat) (1806–1895), British author and diplomat
Charles Murray, 7th Earl of Dunmore (1841–1907), Scottish peer and Conservative politician
Charles James Murray (1851–1929), British politician
Charles Murray, Lord Murray (1866–1936), Scottish Conservative politician, lawyer and judge
Charles Murray Turpin (1878–1946), member of the U.S. House of Representatives from Pennsylvania
Ed Murray (Tennessee politician) (Charles Edward Murray, 1928–2009), US politician, who was speaker of the Tennessee House of Representatives

Entertainers 
Charles Murray (poet) (1864–1941), poet who wrote in the Doric dialect of Scots
Charles Murray (American actor) (1872–1941), American actor from the silent era, also called Charlie Murray
Charles Murray (Scottish actor) (1754–1821), Scottish actor and dramatist
Charles Shaar Murray (born 1951), English rock music writer

Others 
Charles P. Murray Jr. (1921–2011), American soldier and Medal of Honor recipient
Charles Murray (political scientist) (born 1943), American policy writer, co-wrote The Bell Curve and Losing Ground
Charles Murray (boxer) (born 1968), American boxer, former Light Welterweight Champion
Charles Murray (bishop) (1889–1950), Anglican Bishop of Riverina, Australia
Charles Murray (trade unionist) (died 1889), British trade unionist and socialist activist
Charles Fairfax Murray (1849–1919), English painter, dealer, collector, benefactor and art historian
Charles I. Murray (1896–1977), United States Marine Corps general
Charles Oliver Murray (1842–1923), Scottish engraver
Charles Wilson Murray (1820–1873), English businessman and member of the Legislative Council of Hong Kong
Charles Wyndham Murray (1844–1928), British Army officer and politician

See also 
Charlie Murray (disambiguation)
Chic Murray (Charles Murray, 1919–1985), Scottish comic